Juan José 'Juanjo' Camacho Barnola (born 2 August 1980) is a Spanish former footballer who played as an attacking midfielder.

He spent most of his professional career with Huesca, appearing in more than 400 official matches for the club and in several Segunda División seasons. He also spent some time in La Liga with Zaragoza, and had a two-year spell in the Scottish Premier League with Livingston.

Club career
Born in Valencia, Valencian Community, Camacho started playing professionally for Real Zaragoza, but appeared almost exclusively for the B team in the Segunda División B, also playing one season in Segunda División with Recreativo de Huelva, on loan. Released in the summer of 2001 he returned to the third division, representing Real Madrid Castilla.

In the following two years, Camacho played in Scotland for Livingston, teaming up with compatriot Guillermo Amor in his first season and being relatively used overall. He then returned to Zaragoza, but could only make five La Liga appearances, all in the closing stages of 2004–05, being again almost exclusively associated with the Aragonese club's reserves and also being loaned to UE Lleida for five months.

Camacho played for two teams in the following two campaigns, SD Huesca and UD Vecindario, both in division three. He returned to Huesca in 2008 with the team now in the second tier, and settled there as first choice the following years; in 2010–11 he scored a career-high 13 goals (squad best), also being their most utilised player overall (3,675 minutes).

On 26 November 2017, in a 2–0 away loss against Granada CF, Camacho appeared in his 400th competitive match for Huesca. He contributed 20 scoreless appearances during that season, as the club reached the top flight for the first time in history.

Camacho announced his retirement on 14 May 2019, at the age of 38.

Personal life
Camacho's father Juan José was also a footballer, as younger brother Ignacio. The latter was also a midfielder brought up at Zaragoza but, as a professional, played mostly for Málaga CF.

Honours
Spain U16
UEFA European Under-16 Championship: 1997

References

External links
Huesca official profile 

1980 births
Living people
Spanish footballers
Footballers from Valencia (city)
Association football midfielders
La Liga players
Segunda División players
Segunda División B players
Real Zaragoza B players
Real Zaragoza players
Recreativo de Huelva players
Real Madrid Castilla footballers
UE Lleida players
SD Huesca footballers
UD Vecindario players
Scottish Premier League players
Livingston F.C. players
Spain youth international footballers
Spanish expatriate footballers
Expatriate footballers in Scotland
Spanish expatriate sportspeople in Scotland